Mel Tormé at the Red Hill is a 1962 live album by Mel Tormé, recorded at the Red Hill Club in Pennsauken, New Jersey.

This was Tormé's first album for Atlantic Records.

Track listing 
 "Shaking the Blues Away" (Irving Berlin) – 2:08
 "I'm Beginning to See the Light" (Duke Ellington, Don George, Johnny Hodges) – 2:30
 "Fly Me to the Moon" (Bart Howard) – 4:11
 Medley: "A Foggy Day"/"A Nightingale Sang in Berkeley Square" (George Gershwin, Ira Gershwin)/(Eric Maschwitz, Manning Sherwin) – 3:30
 "Love for Sale" (Cole Porter) – 2:47
 "It's De-Lovely" (Porter) – 4:22
 "Mountain Greenery" (Lorenz Hart, Richard Rodgers) – 2:49
 "Nevertheless (I'm in Love with You)" (Bert Kalmar, Harry Ruby) – 3:26
 "Early Autumn" (Ralph Burns, Woody Herman, Johnny Mercer) – 3:12
 "Anything Goes" (Porter) – 3:17
 "(Ah, the Apple Trees) When the World Was Young" (Mercer, M. Philippe-Gerard, Angele Vannier) – 3:44
 "Love Is Just Around the Corner" (Lewis Gensler, Leo Robin) – 3:15

Personnel 
 Mel Tormé – vocals, (piano on three tracks)
 Jimmy Wisner – piano
 Ace Tesone – bass
 Dave Levin – drums

References 

Mel Tormé live albums
1962 live albums
Atlantic Records live albums